Grim Rock is a rock awash  south-southeast of the Gedges Rocks and  west-northwest of Cape Perez, lying in Grandidier Channel off the west coast of Graham Land, Antarctica. It was charted in February 1936 by the British Graham Land Expedition under John Rymill, and so named from its grim appearance.

References

Rock formations of Graham Land
Graham Coast